The 2009–10 Virginia Cavaliers men's basketball team represented the University of Virginia during the 2009–10 NCAA Division I men's basketball season. The team was led by first-year head coach Tony Bennett, and played their home games at John Paul Jones Arena as members of the Atlantic Coast Conference.

Last season
The Cavaliers fell to 10–18, with a conference record of 4–12. This was their worst conference record since Pete Gillen's final season in 2004–05, and the worst overall record for Virginia in four decades. At the conclusion of the season, head coach Dave Leitao resigned. On April 1, 2009, Washington State head coach Tony Bennett was announced as his replacement.

Roster

Schedule 

|-
!colspan=9 style="background:#00214e; color:#f56d22;"| Regular season

|-
!colspan=9 style="background:#00214e; color:#f56d22;"| ACC Tournament

References

Virginia
Virginia Cavaliers men's basketball seasons
2009 in sports in Virginia
2010 in sports in Virginia